Aledo High School may refer to:

Aledo High School (Illinois), located in Aledo, Illinois, United States
Aledo High School (Texas), located in Aledo, Texas, United States